Simon Karlsson (born July 23, 1993) is a Swedish professional ice hockey player. He is currently playing with EHC Bayreuth of the DEL2. Karlsson was selected by the Nashville Predators in the 5th round (142nd overall) of the 2011 NHL Entry Draft.

Karlsson made his Swedish Hockey League debut playing with Malmö Redhawks during the 2010-11 Elitserien season.

References

External links

1993 births
Living people
EHC Bayreuth players
HV71 players
Karlskrona HK players
Malmö Redhawks players
Nashville Predators draft picks
Plymouth Whalers players
Oshawa Generals players
Södertälje SK players
HK Poprad players
Swedish ice hockey defencemen
Sportspeople from Malmö
Stjernen Hockey players
Tingsryds AIF players
VIK Västerås HK players
Swedish expatriate ice hockey players in Germany
Swedish expatriate ice hockey players in Canada
Swedish expatriate ice hockey players in the United States
Swedish expatriate sportspeople in Slovakia
Swedish expatriate ice hockey players in Norway
Expatriate ice hockey players in Slovakia